Simone Rossmann is an Austrian designer specialised in product design and concept development. Simone grew up in the town of the Alps - in Innsbruck. The surrounding of beautiful mountains and historical buildings influenced her keen sense of art and design. She has been the senior designer of Swarovski for 8 years. in Wattens (Austria) in charge of Home Decor. With a strong taste for beauty, a focus into the functionality of the objects, and her unique charm have allowed her to collaborate with some of the best designers of Europe. She has also worked in Paris as accessories designer.

Rossmann studied product design at the Kunstuniversität of Linz (Austria) and the Rietveld School of Art & Design in Amsterdam (Netherlands). Besides product design she made of the illustration her second vocation working in several international projects as well as participating in several expositions of art and attended courses of Character Design at the renowned California Institute of the Arts.

Works

Design
Every design act in Simone Rossmanns work is based on a deep questioning in finding a perfect match of market, consumer expectation and production feasibility.
She creates uniqueness as and in a compressed essence of the products which are additionally infused by an elegant sensitivity that creates highly aesthetic expressions in function, form and material.
Every product element is subject of thorough decisions and a skillful solution finding within the complexity of products and markets.
Her love for material and form is equally expressed in every creation as is her conviction to always challenge herself for the best outcome.

Illustration and art
The artwork and illustration created by Simone Rossmann can be described as a highly poetic imagery with a delicately powerful attitude.
In tuning down the backgrounds to function as an airy canvas for story-telling elements her aesthetics combine tender lines with expressions of fantasy in an enchanting mix of neutrals and intense coloring. By contrasting fully detailed with almost invisible motifs, she creates an image of fascinating focal points and a multiplicity of pictures within a picture inviting to explorative journeys within the pieces.

Faint and powerful, gentle and expressive are key elements which also define the use of graphics, colors and styles composing each piece of her art to depict scenarios filled with silent poetry and self-confident impact.

Exhibitions

References

External links
 Swarovski
 Selber Linzer

1978 births
Living people
Businesspeople from Innsbruck
Gerrit Rietveld Academie alumni